Svarfaðardalur ("Svörfuður's valley") is a large valley in central north Iceland. It is a part of the Dalvíkurbyggð municipality. The Svarfaðardalsá River flows down the valley, having its mouth near to the town of Dalvík.
About 10 km from the sea the valley splits in two. The eastern oneis called Skíðadalur and it keeps the main direction of the valley to the southwest, while the other one keeps the name Svarfaðardalur. Numerous small valleys branch off from the main valleys in between the mountains. There are small glaciers in many many of in these valleys. The largest glacier is Gljúfurárjökull, which is at the bottom of Skíðadal and overlooks the settlement. The mountains surrounding Svarfaðardalur are high and steep, with many peaks between 1000-1400 m high. The highest mountains are in Skíðdalur, the highest one is Dýjafjallshnjúkur, 1456 m.

References
Hjörtur Eldjárn Þórarinsson. „Svarfaðardalur og gönguleiðir um fjöllin“. Árbók Ferðafélags Íslands. (1973): 9–119.
Kristmundur Bjarnason. Saga Dalvíkur 1–4. Dalvíkurbær 1978-1985

External links
Dalvíkurbyggð

Valleys of Iceland